The Ramillies-class ships of the line were a class of nine 74-gun third rates, designed for the Royal Navy by Sir Thomas Slade.

Design
There were two distinct sub-groups; four ships were built in the Royal Dockyards to the original design, approved on 25 April 1760 – although the name-ship Ramillies had originally been ordered as a Bellona-class unit. Slade subsequently amended his design for the ships which were to be built by commercial contractors – this modified design, with slightly amended dimensions, being approved on 13 January 1761.

Ships

First group
Dockyard-built ships:

Builder: Chatham Dockyard
Ordered: 1 December 1759
Laid down: 25 August 1760
Launched: 25 April 1763
Completed: November 1763
Fate: Abandoned and burned off Newfoundland, 21 September 1782.

Builder: Deptford Dockyard
Ordered: 22 November 1760
Laid down: 2 June 1761
Launched: 20 July 1765
Completed: 24 September 1765
Fate: Broken up at Chatham, March 1813

Builder: Deptford Dockyard
Ordered: 16 December 1761
Laid down: 15 April 1762
Launched: 20 September 1767
Completed: September 1778
Fate: Wrecked off Brest, 25 March 1804.

Builder: Deptford Dockyard
Ordered: 4 December 1762
Laid down: 3 June 1763
Launched: 26 August 1767
Completed: 1 December 1767
Fate: Wrecked off Belle Île, 4 November 1800

Second (modified) group
Contract-built ships:

Builder: John Barnard, Harwich
Ordered: 1 January 1761
Laid down: February 1761
Launched: 4 September 1762
Completed: 18 December 1762
Fate: Burned following the Battle of the Chesapeake, 11 September 1781

Builder: Thomas West, Deptford
Ordered: 1 January 1761
Laid down: June 1761
Launched: 10 November 1764
Completed: 6 January 1765 at Woolwich Dockyard
Fate: Sold out of the service in the East Indies, 1811

Builder: John and William Wells, Deptford
Ordered: 12 October 1761
Laid down: December 1761
Launched: 9 March 1765
Completed: February 1777 at Chatham Dockyard.
Fate: Wrecked off Yarmouth, 16 March 1801

Builder: John Barnard, Harwich
Ordered: 16 December 1761
Laid down: February 1762
Launched: 25 October 1764
Completed: 10 December 1764
Fate: Broken up at Portsmouth, January 1817

Builder: Henry Bird and Roger Fisher, Milford Haven
Ordered: 16 December 1762
Laid down: March 1762
Launched: 4 June 1765
Completed: 22 December 1770 at Plymouth Dockyard
Fate: Broken up at Plymouth, August 1783

References

Lavery, Brian (2003) The Ship of the Line – Volume 1: The development of the battlefleet 1650–1850. Conway Maritime Press. .

 
Ship of the line classes